The Diocese of Macedonia was a diocese of the later Roman Empire, forming part of the praetorian prefecture of Illyricum. Its administrative centre was Thessaloniki.

History
The diocese was formed, probably under Constantine I (r. 306–337), from the division of the Diocletianic Diocese of Moesia. It included the provinces of Macedonia Prima, Macedonia Salutaris, Thessalia, Epirus vetus, Epirus nova, Achaea, and Crete. Alongside Dacia and, until 379, Pannonia, it made up the Prefecture of Illyricum. In 379, Pannonia was detached and merged into the Praetorian prefecture of Italy and Thessaloniki became the Prefecture's new capital city instead of Sirmium.

See also
Macedonia (terminology)
Macedonia (Roman province)
Macedonia (theme)

Sources
 Notitia dignitatum, Pars Orientalis, III
Joseph Roisman, Ian Worthington, A Companion to Ancient Macedonia,

Macedonia
Ancient Albania
Greece in the Roman era
Macedonia (Roman province)
Byzantine provinces in Macedonia
Civil dioceses of the Byzantine Empire
Praetorian prefecture of Illyricum
Christianity in North Macedonia